Vevelstad is a municipality in Nordland county, Norway. It is part of the Helgeland traditional region. The administrative centre of the municipality is the village of Forvika.

The  municipality is the 199th largest by area out of the 356 municipalities in Norway. Vevelstad is the 352nd most populous municipality in Norway with a population of 462.

General information

The municipality of Vevelstad was established on 1 July 1916 when it was separated from the municipality of Tjøtta. Initially, the municipality had 1,097 residents. On 1 July 1920, the Giskå farm area (population: 10) was transferred from Tjøtta to Vevelstad. The borders have not changed since that time.

Name
The municipality (originally the parish) is named after the old Vevelstad farm, since the first Vevelstad Church was built there.

Coat of arms
The coat of arms was granted on 13 November 1991. The official blazon is "Azure, three inverted couped chevrons argent, two and one". This means the arms have a blue field (background) and the charge is three V-shaped figures (two over one). The V-shapes have a tincture of argent which means it is commonly colored white, but if it is made out of metal, then silver is used. The arms are canting, showing the first letter of the name of the municipality, V. The municipality applied for arms in the 1970s, but all the proposals were rejected by either the municipal council or the National Archives. Finally, the present arms were adopted and granted in 1991. The arms were designed by Odd P. Olsen.

Churches
The Church of Norway has one parish within the municipality of Vevelstad. It is part of the Sør-Helgeland prosti (deanery) in the Diocese of Sør-Hålogaland.

Geography
The municipality lies in the middle of Norway, surrounded by mountains and fjords. A lot of the municipality is a part of Lomsdal–Visten National Park. The lake Søre Vistvatnet lies in the southeastern part of the municipality inside the national park. Most of the residents live along the coastline or on the island Hamnøya. The mouth of the Velfjorden lies in the southern part of the municipality.

Government
All municipalities in Norway, including Vevelstad, are responsible for primary education (through 10th grade), outpatient health services, senior citizen services, unemployment and other social services, zoning, economic development, and municipal roads. The municipality is governed by a municipal council of elected representatives, which in turn elect a mayor.  The municipality falls under the Brønnøy District Court and the Hålogaland Court of Appeal.

Municipal council
The municipal council of Vevelstad is made up of 13 representatives that are elected to four year terms. The party breakdown of the council is as follows:

Mayor
The mayors of Vevelstad (incomplete list):

1945-1967: Ragnvald Vevelstad (Ap)
1967-1970: Eilif Slotvik 
1970-1975: Ragnvald Vevelstad (Ap)
1976-1979: Alf Arnes (V)
1980-1987: Per Vevelstad (Ap)
1988-1999: Harald Axelsen (Ap)
1999-2003: Arnt O. Åsvang (LL)
2003-2015: Ken-Richard Hansen (LL)
2015-2019: Kari Anne Bøkestad Andreassen (LL)
2019–present: Torhild Haugann (Sp)

Notable people 
 Kari Anne Bøkestad Andreassen (born 1973 in Vevelstad) a Norwegian politician, the first female Mayor of the municipality

References

External links

Municipal fact sheet from Statistics Norway 
http://oklausse.home.online.no/vevelstad/

 
Municipalities of Nordland
1916 establishments in Norway